The Baird Hardware Company Warehouse (also known as the Baird Center) is a historic building in Gainesville, Florida, United States. It is located at 619 South Main Street. On November 25, 1985, it was added to the U.S. National Register of Historic Places.

It is currently the home of the Acrosstown Repertory Theatre.

References

External links
 Alachua County listings at National Register of Historic Places
 Alachua County listings at Florida's Office of Cultural and Historical Programs
 Virtual tour of Downtown Gainesville and Related Structures at Alachua County's Department of Growth Management
 History of Baird Hardware, opened in 1890, intrigues actress at The Gainesville Sun

Buildings and structures in Gainesville, Florida
National Register of Historic Places in Gainesville, Florida
Warehouses on the National Register of Historic Places
1890 establishments in Florida
Commercial buildings completed in 1890